VP Awards or VisionPlus Awards is a recognized award for the optical and eyewear industry.

The jury members for the Awards in India were :
Mr. B K Gupta, GKB Opticals, Kolkata; 
Mr. Surendra Gangar, Gangar Eyenation, Mumbai; 
Mr. Sudershan Binani, Himalaya Optical, Kolkata; 
Mr. Hemanth Manay, S R Gopal Rao Optical, Bangalore; 
Mr. Snehal Turakhia, Turakhia Opticians, Chennai

The VP Awards were announced on March 9, 2014, at the Westin Mumbai Garden City in Goregaon. 
Singer Nakash Aziz, of Indian Idol fame,  performed at the program.

After its launch in the India market the awards collaborated with the Dubai World Trade Centre's Vision-X exhibition to bring out the awards under the title Vision-X VP Awards in the Middle East.

The nominations Jury saw the coming together of some of the biggest names in the Middle Eastern eyewear retail.
Mr Kian Saadat represented Hassan's; 
Mr Saeed Emam and Mr Khaled Mahmoud represented Magrabi Opticals; 
Mr Uday Shrikantiya and Mr Avinash Dudeja represented Rivoli EyeZone; 
Mr Mamdoh Rouhani represented Saudi Optic House; 
Mr Ali Yateem and Mr Mathews Jacob represented Yateem Opticians;

The awards were given away on the conclusion of the first day of the Vision-X exhibition, Dubai

References

Additional References
 http://www.aoyamagroup.com/vision-plus-awards/
 http://www.visottica.com/award-winner-vision-plus-award/
 http://www.nidek-intl.com/news/2014/20141217.html
 http://www.indiaprwire.com/pressrelease/education/20140317299699.htm

Business and industry awards